Coleocephalocereus is a genus of erect and semi-erect columnar cacti from Brazil. These species develop a cephalium with wool and bristles. They are common to the inselbergs of the Brazilian Atlantic rainforest, and can comprise a dominant portion of the flora in these isolated, dome-shaped rocky outcrops.

Species

Synonymy
The genus Buiningia Buxb. has been brought into synonymy with this genus.

References

Cactoideae genera